The Freyssinet Test Arch (in French Arche d'essai Freyssinet) is a prestressed concrete arch built in 1909 in Moulins, Allier by Eugène Freyssinet1. Its purpose was to test the resistance of this material to traction exerted on very flat and long-range arches. As the first testimony to this innovative technique, the arch has been registered as a Monument historique since October 2021 with Boutiron Bridge, the only existing original bridge of the three.

References

Prestressed concrete construction
Buildings and structures in Moulins, Allier
Monuments historiques of Allier
1909 in technology